The Rüchigrat (2,657 m) is a mountain of the Schwyzer Alps, located west of Luchsingen in the canton of Glarus. It lies south of the Glärnisch, on the range between the valley of the Klöntalersee and the main Linth valley.

The Rüchigrat consists of a two kilometres long ridge, which culminates at the summit named Bösbächistock.

References

External links
Rüchigrat on Hikr

Mountains of the Alps
Mountains of Switzerland
Mountains of the canton of Glarus
Two-thousanders of Switzerland